Stay with Me (also known as Meet the Memories - First Love) is the world's 1st 4DX VR film that screened in a 4DX theater.

Plot
Bittersweet first love story of a stage frightened prospective musician Woo-jin (Kim Jung-hyun) and vivacious would be actress Yeon-soo (Seo Yea-ji).

Cast 
 Seo Yea-ji as Yeon-Soo
 Kim Jung-hyun as Woo-jin
 Dong Hyun-bae as jae-hyun
 Bae Noo-ri as Mi-hee

References

External links 
 

2018 films
South Korean romantic drama films
4DX films
Virtual reality films
2010s South Korean films